The Constitutio Antoniniana (Latin for: "Constitution [or Edict] of Antoninus") (also called the Edict of Caracalla or the Antonine Constitution) was an edict issued in AD 212, by the Roman Emperor Caracalla. It declared that all free men in the Roman Empire were to be given full Roman citizenship (by extension all free women in the Empire were to be given the same rights as Roman women, such as the jus trium liberorum), with the exception of the dediticii, people who had become subject to Rome through surrender in war, and freed slaves.

Before AD 212, full Roman citizenship was mostly only held by inhabitants of Roman Italy. Colonies of Romans established in the provinces, Romans (or their descendants) living in provinces, the inhabitants of various cities throughout the Empire, and small numbers of local nobles (such as kings of client countries) also held full citizenship. Provincials, on the other hand, were usually non-citizens, although some held the Latin rights. Veterans of the Auxilia were also granted Roman citizenship on discharge. Being a Roman citizen remained a well sought-after status till 212. 

As a result, vast numbers of new citizens assumed the nomen Aurelius, in honour of their patron (whose full name was Marcus Aurelius Antoninus), including several emperors: seven of the eleven emperors between Gallienus and Diocletian (Claudius Gothicus, Quintillus, Probus, Carus, Carinus, Numerian and Maximian) bore the name "Marcus Aurelius".

Analysis 
The Roman jurist Ulpian ( 170223) states in the Digest: "All persons throughout the Roman world were made Roman citizens by an edict of the Emperor Antoninus Caracalla" (D. 1.5.17).

The context of the decree is still subject to discussion. According to historian and politician Cassius Dio ( AD 155 AD 235), the main reason Caracalla passed the law was to increase the number of people available to tax. In the words of Cassius Dio: "This was the reason why he made all the people in his empire Roman citizens; nominally he was honoring them, but his real purpose was to increase his revenues by this means, inasmuch as aliens did not have to pay most of these taxes." However, few of those that gained citizenship were wealthy, and while it is true that Rome was in a difficult financial situation, it is thought that this could not have been the sole purpose of the edict. Cassius Dio generally saw Caracalla as a bad, contemptible emperor.

Another goal may have been to increase the number of men able to serve in the legions, as only full citizens could serve as legionaries in the Roman army. In scholarly interpretations that agree with a model of moral degeneration as the reason for the fall of the Roman Empire, most famously the model followed by British historian Edward Gibbon, the edict came at a cost to the auxiliaries, which primarily consisted of non-citizen men.

Additionally, before the edict, one of the main ways to acquire Roman citizenship was to enlist in the Roman army, the completion of service in which would give the citizenship to the discharged soldier. The edict may have made enlistment in the army less attractive to most, and perhaps the recruiting difficulties of the Roman army by the end of the 3rd century were related to this .

In the analyses of more recent scholars, the Constitutio Antoniniana marks a major milestone in the provincialisation of Roman law, meaning that the gap between private law in the provinces and private law in Italy narrowed.  This is because, in granting citizenship to all men in the provinces, much private law had to be re-written to conform with the law that applied to Roman citizens in Rome.  To these scholars, it therefore also marks the beginning of a process by which imperial constitutions became the primary source of Roman law.

See also
 Constitution (Roman law)
 Peregrinus (Roman)

References

External links
 The Roman Law Library, incl. Constitutiones principis

212
3rd century in law
Roman nationality law
Edicts
210s in the Roman Empire
Caracalla